Sorkheh is a city in Semnan Province, Iran.

Sorkheh or Serkheh may also refer to:
 Sorkheh, Bostanabad, East Azerbaijan Province
 Sorkheh (Sorkheh-ye Saru Khalil), Bostanabad, East Azerbaijan Province
 Sorkheh, Marand, East Azerbaijan Province
 Sorkheh 1, Khuzestan Province
 Sorkheh 2, Khuzestan Province
 Sorkheh County, an administrative subdivision in Semnan Province
 Sorkheh District, a former administrative subdivision in Semnan Province
 Sorkheh Rural District, an administrative subdivision in Khuzestan Province